Niña is a ship used by Christopher Columbus in 1492.

Niña (Spanish for "little girl") may also refer to:

La Niña, an ocean-atmosphere phenomenon
Niña (name)

Arts and entertainment
"Niña Amada Mía" (telenovela), a Mexican soap opera
La niña (TV series), a Colombian drama series
"Niña" (La 5ª Estación song), 2004
"Niña" (Reik song), 2005
La Niña (album), a 2021 album by Spanish singer Lola Índigo

See also
Nina (disambiguation)
Nena (disambiguation)